The 2009 Melbourne Cup, the 149th running of Australia's most prestigious Thoroughbred horse race was run on Tuesday, 3 November 2009, starting at 3:00 PM local time (0400 UTC).

The race was won by Shocking.
The 9–1 winner, trained by Mark Kavanagh and ridden by Corey Brown, won by three-quarters of a length.

Field
Horses are from Australia, unless otherwise indicated.

Notes

Horses in barriers to the outside of the scratched horse will move inwards.

References 

2009
Melbourne Cup
Melbourne Cup
2000s in Melbourne
November 2009 sports events in Australia